The Radical, républicain, démocrate et progressiste (RRDP) is a French parliamentary group formed on June 26, 2012. It brought together the Radical Party of the Left and some of the various Deputies from more minor left wing parties, or independents. Roger-Gérard Schwartzenberg is the chairman.

Members
 Radical Party of the Left : 12 members
 Roger-Gérard Schwartzenberg (Chairman)
 Gérard Charasse
 Stéphane Claireaux
 Jeanine Dubié
 Paul Giacobbi
 Joël Giraud
 Jacques Krabal
 Jean-Pierre Maggi
 Dominique Orliac
 Sylvia Pinel
 Stéphane Saint-André
 Alain Tourret
 Socialist Party of France : 1 member
 Jérôme Lambert
 Democratic Movement : 1 member
 Thierry Robert
 Progressive Unitary Movement : 1 member
 Jean-Noël Carpentier
 United Guadeloupe, Socialism and Realities : 1 member 
 Ary Chalus
 Miscellaneous Left : 1 member
 Olivier Falorni

External links
Official website 
List of members 

Left-wing parties in France
Parliamentary groups in France